Elaphrus splendidus is a species of ground beetle in the subfamily Elaphrinae. It was described by Fisher von Wandheim in 1829.

References

Elaphrinae
Beetles described in 1829